This article contains a list of Wikipedia articles about recipients of the United States Army's Soldier's Medal, awarded to "any person of the Armed Forces of the United States or of a friendly foreign nation who, while serving in any capacity with the Army of the United States, distinguished himself or herself by heroism not involving actual conflict with an enemy." (Army Regulation 600-8-22).

Soldier's Medal

Inter-war years
William A. Matheny, USAAF

World War II

 Marty Allen, USAAF (comedian)
 Allison Brooks, USAAF
 Frank D. Peregory, USA, MOH
 Charles A. MacGillivary, USA, MOH
 David E. Grange, Jr., WW2 or Korea
 Bob Hoover, USAAF
 Otto Kerner, Jr., USA
 Henry Mucci
 Walter K. Wilson, Jr., USA, WW2 or other

Korea

 John T. Corley, USA, Korea or WW2
 John Galvin, USA, Korea or Vietnam
 Reis Leming, USAF, during Korean War
 Leo J. Meyer, USA, Korea, 1951
 Edwin W. Rawlings, USAF, Post-Korea, 1954
 Leon L. Van Autreve, Korea or other

Vietnam

 Glenn Andreotta, USA
 Leonard Boswell, USA
 Lawrence Colburn, USA
 Richard Gary Davis, USA
 William W. Hartzog, USA
 Mike Hayden, USA
 Colin Powell, USA
 Doug Peacock, USA
 Donn A. Starry, USA
 Hugh Thompson, USA
 Alfred Valenzuela, USA

Gulf War

 Wayne A. Downing, USA, Gulf War or Vietnam

Awarded Soldier's Medal

 James Leroy Bondsteel, USA, MOH, Vietnam
 John K. Singlaub, USA
 Melbourne Kimsey, USAF

References

Awards and decorations of the United States Army